"Tous les mêmes" is a song by Belgian singer Stromae, released on 23 September 2013. The song has peaked at number one on music charts in both Belgium and France.

Music video
The music video, directed by Henry Scholfield, was released on YouTube on 18 December 2013 and features Stromae partly dressed as a woman. The track shows the life of female Stromae, annoyed as she is with the attitude of men and what they do. Throughout the video, Stromae depicts various stereotypical remarks women make about men, accompanied by the non-verbal cues the other characters in the video make. The lighting effects in the video (green light for male Stromae, pink light for female Stromae) aid the interpretation of the song. The video has received over 364 million views as of November 2022.

Chart positions

Weekly charts

Year-end charts

Certifications

<--Post by François Delétraz a Figaro Magazine journalist-->

Cover versions 
Angelina performed the song during the final of the 2017 season of the Voice Kids France, that she won.

References

External links
  

2013 singles
2013 songs
Stromae songs
SNEP Top Singles number-one singles
Ultratop 50 Singles (Wallonia) number-one singles
Songs written by Stromae
Electro swing songs